Conrad Victor Ankarcrona (1823–1912) was a Grand Master of the Court of the King of Sweden.

Family and children
Ankarcrona was the son of Theodor Vilhelm Ankarcrona, Gentleman of the Bedchamber of the Court of the King of Sweden, and first wife Charlotta, Friherrinnan Sture.

He married in 1851 his cousin Ebba Charlotta, Grefvinnan Bielke (1828–1911), daughter of Niels, Grefve Bielke, Gentleman of the Bedchamber of the King of Sweden, and wife Ebba Florentine, Friherrinnan Sture. They had at least one son, Oscar Carl Gustav Ankarcrona, born on 10 June 1857, a Huntsman-Major of the Court of the King of Sweden, Major of the Swedish Army, etc., who married on 20 November 1886 Anna Elisabeth Aurora Carleson (5 November 1867 -), and had issue.

References

1823 births
1912 deaths
Swedish nobility
Recipients of the Cross of Honour of the Order of the Dannebrog
Grand Crosses of the Order of the Dannebrog